Kodalia Union is a Union parishad of Mollahat Upazila, Bagerhat District in Khulna Division of Bangladesh. It has an area of 78.17 km2 (30.18 sq mi) and a population of 18,073.

References

Unions of Mollahat Upazila
Unions of Bagerhat District
Unions of Khulna Division